The 2018 FIFA World Cup was the 21st FIFA World Cup, the quadrennial world championship for national football teams organized by FIFA. It took place in Russia from 14 June to 15 July 2018, after the country was awarded the hosting rights in 2010. It was the eleventh time the championships had been held in Europe, and the first time they were held in Eastern Europe. At an estimated cost of over $14.2 billion, it was the most expensive World Cup ever held until it was surpassed by the 2022 World Cup in Qatar.

The tournament phase involved 32 teams, of which 31 came through qualifying competitions, while as the host nation Russia qualified automatically. Of the 32, 20 had also appeared in the 2014 event, while Iceland and Panama each made their first appearance at the World Cup. 64 matches were played in 12 venues across 11 cities. Germany, the defending champions, were eliminated in the group stage for the first time since 1938. Host nation Russia was eliminated in the quarter-finals. In the final, France played Croatia on 15 July at the Luzhniki Stadium in Moscow. France won the match 4–2, claiming their second World Cup and becoming the fourth consecutive title won by a European team, after Italy in 2006, Spain in 2010, and Germany in 2014.

Croatian player Luka Modrić was voted the tournament's best player, winning the Golden Ball. England's Harry Kane won the Golden Boot as he scored the most goals during the tournament with six. Belgium's Thibaut Courtois won the Golden Glove, awarded to the goalkeeper with the best performance. It has been estimated that more than 3 million people attended games during the tournament.

Host selection

The bidding procedure to host the 2018 and 2022 FIFA World Cup tournaments began in January 2009, and national associations had until 2 February 2009 to register their interest. Initially, nine countries placed bids for the 2018 FIFA World Cup, but Mexico later withdrew from the proceedings, and Indonesia's bid was rejected by FIFA in February 2010 after the Indonesian government failed to submit a letter to support the bid. During the bidding process, the three remaining non-UEFA nations (Australia, Japan, and the United States) gradually withdrew from the 2018 bids, and thus all UEFA nations were ruled out of the 2022 bid. As such, there were eventually four bids for the 2018 FIFA World Cup, two of which were joint bids: England, Russia, Netherlands/Belgium, and Portugal/Spain.

The 22-member FIFA Executive Committee convened in Zürich on 2 December 2010 to vote to select the hosts of both tournaments. Russia won the right to be the 2018 host in the second round of voting. The Portugal/Spain bid came second, and that from Belgium/Netherlands third. England, which was bidding to host its second tournament, was eliminated in the first round.

The voting results were:

Host selection criticism
The choice of Russia as host was controversial. Issues included the high level of racism in Russian football, human rights abuses by Russian authorities, and discrimination against LGBT people in wider Russian society. Russia's involvement in the ongoing conflict in Ukraine had also prompted calls for the tournament to be moved, particularly following the annexation of Crimea. In 2014, FIFA president Sepp Blatter stated that "the World Cup has been given and voted to Russia and we are going forward with our work".

Russia was criticised for alleged abuse of migrant labourers in the construction of World Cup venues, with Human Rights Watch reporting cases where workers were left unpaid, made to work in dangerously cold conditions, or suffering reprisals for raising concerns. A few pundits claimed it was slave labour. In May 2017, FIFA president Gianni Infantino admitted there had been human rights abuses of North Korean workers involved in the construction of Saint Petersburg's Zenit Arena. By June 2017, at least 17 workers had died on World Cup construction sites, according to Building and Wood Workers' International. In August, a group of eight US senators called on FIFA to consider dismissing Russia as the World Cup host if an independent investigation verified allegations of North Koreans being subjected to forced labor.

Racism and Neo-nazi symbols displayed in the past by some Russian football fans drew criticism, with documented incidents of racial chants, banners spewing hate-filled messages, and sometimes assaults on people from the Caucasus and Central Asia. In March 2015, FIFA's then Vice President Jeffrey Webb said that Russia posed a huge challenge from a racism standpoint, and that a World Cup could not be held there under the current conditions. On July, United Nations anti-discrimination official Yuri Boychenko said that Russian soccer authorities had failed to fully grasp what racism was and needed to do more to combat it. To address this as well as concerns of hooliganism in general, Russian intelligence services blacklisted over 400 fans from entering the stadiums by June 2018, with 32 other countries also sending officers to help local police screen attendees for valid ID cards.

Allegations of corruption in the bidding processes and concerns over bribery on the part of the Russian team and corruption by FIFA members for the 2018 and 2022 World Cups led to threats from England's FA to boycott the tournament. They claimed that four members of the executive committee had requested bribes to vote for England, and Sepp Blatter had said it had already been arranged before the vote that Russia would win. FIFA appointed Michael J. Garcia, a US attorney, to investigate and produce a report on the corruption allegations. Although the report was never published, FIFA released a 42-page summary of its findings as determined by German judge Hans-Joachim Eckert. Eckert's summary cleared Russia and Qatar of any wrongdoing, but was denounced by critics as a whitewash. Because of the controversy, the FA refused to accept Eckert's absolving Russia from blame. Greg Dyke called for a re-examination of the affair and David Bernstein called for a boycott of the World Cup. Garcia criticised the summary as being "materially incomplete" with "erroneous representations of the facts and conclusions", and appealed to FIFA's Appeal Committee. The committee declined to hear his appeal, so Garcia resigned to protest of FIFA's conduct, citing a "lack of leadership" and lack of confidence in Eckert's independence.

On 3 June 2015, the FBI confirmed that federal authorities were investigating the bidding and awarding processes for the 2018 and 2022 World Cups. In an interview published on 7 June 2015, Domenico Scala, the head of FIFA's Audit And Compliance Committee, stated that "should there be evidence that the awards to Qatar and Russia came only because of bought votes, then the awards could be cancelled". Prince William of Wales and former British Prime Minister David Cameron attended a meeting with FIFA vice-president Chung Mong-joon in which a vote-trading deal for the right to host the 2018 World Cup in England was discussed.

Teams

Qualification

For the first time in the history of the FIFA World Cup, all eligible nations—the 209 FIFA member associations except automatically qualified hosts Russia—applied to enter the qualifying process. Zimbabwe and Indonesia were later disqualified before playing their first matches, while Gibraltar and Kosovo, who joined FIFA on 13 May 2016 after the qualifying draw but before European qualifying had begun, also entered the competition. Places in the tournament were allocated to continental confederations, with the allocation unchanged from the 2014 World Cup. The first qualification game, between Timor-Leste and Mongolia, began in Dili on 12 March 2015 as part of the AFC's qualification, and the main qualifying draw took place at the Konstantinovsky Palace in Strelna, Saint Petersburg, on 25 July 2015.

Of the 32 nations qualified to play at the 2018 FIFA World Cup, 20 countries competed at the previous tournament in 2014. Both Iceland and Panama qualified for the first time, with the former becoming the smallest country in terms of population to reach the World Cup. Other teams returning after absences of at least three tournaments included: Egypt, returning to the finals after their last appearance in 1990; Morocco, who last competed in 1998; Peru, who last appeared in 1982; and Senegal, competing for the second time after reaching the quarter-finals in 2002. It was the first time three Nordic countries (Denmark, Iceland and Sweden) and four Arab nations (Egypt, Morocco, Saudi Arabia and Tunisia) qualified for the World Cup.

Notable teams that failed to qualify included: four-time champions Italy (for the first time since 1958), who were knocked out in a qualification play-off by quarter-finalists Sweden and were the highest-ranked team to not qualify; and the Netherlands, who were three-time runners-up and had finished in third place in 2014, and had qualified for the last three World Cups. Four reigning continental champions: 2017 Africa Cup of Nations winners Cameroon; two-time Copa América champions and 2017 Confederations Cup runners-up Chile; 2016 OFC Nations Cup winners New Zealand; and 2017 CONCACAF Gold Cup champions the United States (for the first time since 1986) also failed to qualify. The other notable qualifying streaks broken were for Ghana and Ivory Coast, both of which had qualified for the three previous tournaments. The lowest-ranked team to qualify was the host nation, Russia.

Note: Numbers in parentheses indicate positions in the FIFA World Rankings at the time of the tournament.

AFC (5)
  (36)
  (37)
  (61)
  (67)
  (57)

CAF (5)
  (45)
  (41)
  (48)
  (27)
  (21)

CONCACAF (3)
  (23)
  (15)
  (55)

CONMEBOL (5)
  (5)
  (2)
  (16)
  (11)
  (14)

OFC (0)
None qualified

UEFA (14)
  (3)
  (20)
  (joint 12)
  (joint 12)
  (7)
  (1)
  (22)
  (8)
  (4)
  (70) (hosts)
  (34)
  (10)
  (24)
  (6)

Draw

The draw was held on 1 December 2017 at 18:00 MSK at the State Kremlin Palace in Moscow. The 32 teams were drawn into eight groups of four, by selecting one team from each of the four ranked pots.

For the draw, the teams were allocated to four pots based entirely on the FIFA World Rankings of October 2017. Pot one contained the hosts Russia (who were automatically assigned to position A1) and the best seven teams. Pot two contained the next best eight teams, and so on for pots three and four. This was different from previous draws, when only pot one was based on FIFA rankings while the remaining pots were based on geographical considerations. However, teams from the same confederation still were not drawn against each other for the group stage, except that two UEFA teams could be in each group. The pots for the draw are shown below.

Squads

Initially, each team had to name a preliminary squad of 30 players, but in February 2018 this was increased to 35. From the preliminary squad, the team had to name a final squad of 23 players (three of whom had to be goalkeepers) by 4 June. Players in the final squad could be replaced for serious injury up to 24 hours prior to kickoff of the team's first match. These replacements did not need to have been named in the preliminary squad.

For players named in the 35-player preliminary squad, there was a mandatory rest period between 21 and 27 May 2018, except for those involved in the 2018 UEFA Champions League Final played on 26 May.

Officiating

On 29 March 2018, FIFA released the list of 36 referees and 63 assistant referees selected to oversee matches. On 30 April 2018, FIFA released the list of 13 video assistant referees, who acted solely in this capacity in the tournament.

Referee Fahad Al-Mirdasi of Saudi Arabia was removed on 30 May 2018 over a match-fixing attempt, along with his two assistant referees, compatriots Mohammed Al-Abakry and Abdulah Al-Shalwai. A new referee was not appointed, but two assistant referees, Hasan Al Mahri of the United Arab Emirates and Hiroshi Yamauchi of Japan, were added to the list. Assistant referee Marwa Range of Kenya also withdrew after the BBC released an investigation conducted by a Ghanaian journalist which implicated him in a bribery scandal.

Video assistant referees
Shortly after the International Football Association Board's decision to incorporate video assistant referees (VARs) into the Laws of the game (LOTG) on 16 March 2018, the FIFA Council took the much-anticipated step of approving the use of VAR for the first time in a FIFA World Cup tournament.

VAR operations for all games were operated from a single headquarters in Moscow, which received live video of the games and were in radio contact with the on-field referees. Systems were in place for communicating VAR-related information to broadcasters and visuals on stadiums' large screens were used for the fans in attendance.

VAR had a significant impact on several games. On 15 June 2018, Diego Costa's first goal against Portugal became the first World Cup goal based on a VAR decision; the first penalty as a result of a VAR decision was awarded to France in their match against Australia on 16 June and resulted in a goal by Antoine Griezmann. A record number of penalties were awarded in the tournament, a phenomenon partially attributed to VAR. Overall, the new technology was both praised and criticised by commentators. FIFA declared the implementation of VAR a success after the first week of competition.

Venues
Russia proposed the following host cities: Kaliningrad, Kazan, Krasnodar, Moscow, Nizhny Novgorod, Rostov-on-Don, Saint Petersburg, Samara, Saransk, Sochi, Volgograd, Yaroslavl, and Yekaterinburg. Each chosen city was located in European Russia (except Yekaterinburg, which lies very close to the Europe-Asia border) in order to reduce travel time for the teams in the huge country. The bid evaluation report stated: "The Russian bid proposes 13 host cities and 16 stadiums, thus exceeding FIFA's minimum requirement. Three of the 16 stadiums would be renovated, and 13 would be newly constructed."

In October 2011, Russia reduced the number of stadiums from 16 to 14. Construction of the proposed Podolsk stadium in the Moscow Oblast was cancelled by the regional government. Also, in the capital, Otkritie Arena was competing with Dynamo Stadium over which would be constructed first.

The final choice of host cities was announced on 29 September 2012. The number of cities was reduced further to 11 and the number of stadiums to 12 as Krasnodar and Yaroslavl were dropped from the final list. Of the 12 stadiums used for the tournament, three (Luzhniki, Yekaterinburg and Sochi) had been extensively renovated and the other nine were brand new; $11.8 billion was spent on hosting the tournament.

Sepp Blatter had said in July 2014 that, given the concerns over the completion of venues in Russia, the number of venues for the tournament may be reduced from 12 to 10. He also said, "We are not going to be in a situation, as is the case of one, two or even three stadiums in South Africa, where it is a problem of what you do with these stadiums".

In October 2014, on their first official visit to Russia, FIFA's inspection committee and its head, Chris Unger, visited St. Petersburg, Sochi, Kazan and both Moscow venues. They were satisfied with the progress. On 8 October 2015, FIFA and the local organising committee agreed on the official names of the stadiums to be used during the tournament. Of the twelve venues, the Luzhniki Stadium in Moscow and the Saint Petersburg Stadium—the two largest stadiums in Russia—were used most; both hosted seven matches. Sochi, Kazan, Nizhny Novgorod and Samara each hosted six matches, including one quarter-final match each, while the Otkritie Stadium in Moscow and the Rostov Stadium hosted five matches, including one round-of-16 match each. Volgograd, Kaliningrad, Yekaterinburg and Saransk each hosted four matches, but did not host any knockout stage games.

Stadiums

Twelve stadiums in eleven Russian cities were built or renovated for the FIFA World Cup. Between 2010 (when Russia were announced as hosts) and 2018, nine of the twelve stadiums were built (some in place of older, outdated venues) and the other three were renovated for the tournament.
 Kaliningrad: Kaliningrad Stadium (new). The first piles were driven into the ground in September 2015. On 11 April 2018 it hosted its first match.
 Kazan: Kazan Arena (new). The stadium was built for the 2013 Summer Universiade. It has since hosted the 2015 World Aquatics Championships and the 2017 FIFA Confederations Cup. It serves as a home arena for FC Rubin Kazan.
 Moscow: Luzhniki Stadium (heavily renovated). The largest stadium in the country, it was closed for renovation in 2013. It was commissioned in November 2017.
 Moscow: Spartak Stadium (new). This stadium is the home arena to its namesake FC Spartak Moscow. In accordance with FIFA requirements, during the 2018 World Cup, it was called Spartak Stadium instead of its usual name Otkritie Arena. It hosted its first match on 5 September 2014.
 Nizhny Novgorod: Nizhny Novgorod Stadium (new). Construction of this stadium commenced in 2015 and was completed in December 2017.
 Rostov-on-Don: Rostov Arena (new). The stadium is located on the left bank of the Don. Construction was completed on 22 December 2017.
 Saint Petersburg: Saint Petersburg Stadium (new). Construction commenced in 2007 after the site, formerly occupied by Kirov Stadium, was cleared. The project was officially completed on 29 December 2016. It has hosted 2017 FIFA Confederations Cup games and served as a venue for UEFA Euro 2020.
 Samara: Samara Arena (new). Construction officially started on 21 July 2014 and was completed on 21 April 2018.
 Saransk: Mordovia Arena (new). The stadium in Saransk was scheduled to be commissioned in 2012 in time for the opening of the all-Russian Spartakiad, but the plan was revised. The opening was rescheduled to 2017. The arena hosted its first match on 21 April 2018.
 Sochi: Fisht Stadium (slightly renovated). This stadium hosted the opening and closing ceremonies of the 2014 Winter Olympics. Afterwards, it was renovated in preparation for the 2017 FIFA Confederations Cup and the 2018 World Cup.
 Volgograd: Volgograd Arena (new). The main Volgograd arena was built on the demolished Central Stadium site, at the foot of the Mamayev Kurgan memorial complex. It was commissioned on 3 April 2018.
 Yekaterinburg: Ekaterinburg Arena (heavily renovated). The Central Stadium of Yekaterinburg had been renovated for the FIFA World Cup. Its stands have a capacity of 35,000 spectators. The renovation project was completed in December 2017.

Team base camps
Base camps were used by the 32 national squads to stay and train before and during the World Cup tournament. On 9 February 2018, FIFA announced the base camps for each participating team.

 Argentina: Bronnitsy, Moscow Oblast
 Australia: Kazan, Tatarstan
 Belgium: Krasnogorsky, Moscow Oblast
 Brazil: Sochi, Krasnodar Krai
 Colombia: Verkhneuslonsky, Tatarstan
 Costa Rica: Saint Petersburg
 Croatia: Roshchino, Leningrad Oblast
 Denmark: Anapa, Krasnodar Krai
 Egypt: Grozny, Chechnya
 England: Repino, Saint Petersburg
 France: Istra, Moscow Oblast
 Germany: Vatutinki, Moscow
 Iceland: Gelendzhik, Krasnodar Krai
 Iran: Bakovka, Moscow Oblast
 Japan: Kazan, Tatarstan
 Mexico: Khimki, Moscow Oblast
 Morocco: Voronezh, Voronezh Oblast
 Nigeria: Yessentuki, Stavropol Krai
 Panama: Saransk, Mordovia
 Peru: Moscow
 Poland: Sochi, Krasnodar Krai
 Portugal: Ramenskoye, Moscow Oblast
 Russia: Khimki, Moscow Oblast
 Saudi Arabia: Saint Petersburg
 Senegal: Kaluga, Kaluga Oblast
 Serbia: Svetlogorsk, Kaliningrad Oblast
 South Korea: Saint Petersburg
 Spain: Krasnodar, Krasnodar Krai
 Sweden: Gelendzhik, Krasnodar Krai
 Switzerland: Togliatti, Samara Oblast
 Tunisia: Pervomayskoye, Moscow Oblast
 Uruguay: Bor, Nizhny Novgorod Oblast

Preparation and costs

Budget

At an estimated cost of over $14.2 billion , the 2018 FIFA event was the most expensive World Cup in history, surpassing the $11.6 billion cost of the 2014 FIFA World Cup in Brazil.

The Russian government had originally earmarked a budget of around $20 billion, which was later slashed to $10 billion, for World Cup preparations. Half was spent on transportation infrastructure. As part of the program to prepare for the 2018 FIFA World Cup, a federal sub-program—"Construction and Renovation of Transport Infrastructure"—was implemented with a total budget of ₽352.5 billion (rubles), with ₽170.3 billion coming from the federal budget, ₽35.1 billion from regional budgets, and ₽147.1 billion from investors. The biggest item of federal spending was the aviation infrastructure costing ₽117.8 billion. Construction of new hotels was a crucial area of infrastructure development in World Cup host cities. Costs continued to mount as preparations were underway.

Infrastructure spending
Platov International Airport in Rostov-on-Don was upgraded with automated air traffic control systems. Modern surveillance, navigation, communication, control, and meteorological support systems were also installed. Koltsovo Airport in Yekaterinburg was upgraded with radio-engineering tools for flight operation and received a second runway. Saransk Airport received a new navigation system; two new hotels were constructed in the city—the Mercure Saransk Centre (Accor Hotels) and Four Points by Sheraton Saransk as well as few other smaller accommodation facilities. In Samara, new tram lines were laid. Khrabrovo Airport in Kaliningrad was upgraded with radio navigation and weather equipment. Renovation and upgraded radio-engineering tools for flight operations was completed in the Moscow, Saint Petersburg, Volgograd, Samara, Yekaterinburg, Kazan and Sochi airports. On 27 March, the Russian Ministry of Construction Industry, Housing and Utilities Sector of reported that all communications within its area of responsibility had been commissioned. The last facility commissioned was a waste treatment station in Volgograd. In Yekaterinburg, where four matches were hosted, hosting costs increased to over ₽7.4 billion, exceeding the ₽5.6 billion rubles originally allocated from the state and regional budget.

Volunteers

Volunteer applications to the 2018 Russia Local Organising Committee opened on 1 June 2016. The 2018 FIFA World Cup Russia Volunteer Program received about 177,000 applications, and engaged a total of 35,000 volunteers. They received training at 15 Volunteer Centres of the local organising committee based in 15 universities, and in volunteer centres in the host cities. Preference, especially in key areas, was given to those with knowledge of a foreign language and volunteering experience, but not necessarily to Russian nationals.

Transport
Free public transport services were offered for ticketholders during the World Cup, including additional trains linking host cities, as well as services such as bus services within them.

Schedule

The full schedule was announced by FIFA on 24 July 2015 without kick-off times, which were confirmed later. On 1 December 2017, following the final draw, FIFA adjusted six kick-off times.

Russia was placed in position A1 in the group stage and played in the opening match at the Luzhniki Stadium in Moscow on 14 June against Saudi Arabia, the two lowest-ranked teams of the tournament at the time of the final draw. The Luzhniki Stadium also hosted the second semi-final on 11 July and the final on 15 July. The Krestovsky Stadium in Saint Petersburg hosted the first semi-final on 10 July and the third place play-off on 14 July.

Opening ceremony

The opening ceremony took place on Thursday, 14 June 2018, at the Luzhniki Stadium in Moscow, preceding the opening match of the tournament between hosts Russia and Saudi Arabia.

At the start of the ceremony, Russian president Vladimir Putin gave a speech, welcoming the countries of the world to Russia and calling football a uniting force. Brazilian World Cup-winning striker Ronaldo entered the stadium with a child in a Russia jersey. Pop singer Robbie Williams then sang two of his songs solo before he and Russian soprano Aida Garifullina performed a duet. Dancers dressed in the flags of the 32 competing teams appeared carrying a sign with the name of each nation. At the end of the ceremony Ronaldo reappeared with the official match ball which had returned from the International Space Station in early June.

Young participants of the international children's social programme Football for Friendship from 211 countries and regions took part in the opening ceremony of the FIFA World Cup at the Luzhniki stadium.

Group stage

Competing countries were divided into eight groups of four teams (groups A to H). Teams in each group played one another in a round-robin, with the top two teams advancing to the knockout stage. Ten European teams and four South American teams progressed to the knockout stage, together with Japan and Mexico.

For the first time since 1938, Germany, the reigning champions, were eliminated in the first round. This was the third consecutive tournament in which the holders were eliminated in the first round, after Italy in 2010 and Spain in 2014. No African team progressed to the second round for the first time since 1982. The fair play criteria came into use for the first time when Japan qualified over Senegal because the team had received fewer yellow cards. Only one match, France versus Denmark, was goalless. Until then there were a record 36 straight games in which at least one goal was scored. All times listed below are local time.

Group A

Group B

Group C

Group D

Group E

Group F

Group G

Group H

Knockout stage

In the knockout stages, if a match was level at the end of normal playing time, extra time was played (two periods of 15 minutes each) and followed, if necessary, by a penalty shoot-out to determine the winners. If a match went into extra time, each team was allowed to make a fourth substitution, the first time this had been allowed in a FIFA World Cup tournament. Below is the bracket for the knockout round of the tournament, teams in bold denote match winners.

Bracket

Round of 16

Quarter-finals

Semi-finals

Third place play-off

Final

Statistics

Goalscorers

Discipline

In total, only four players were sent off in the entire tournament, the fewest since 1978. International Football Association Board technical director David Elleray stated a belief that this was due to the introduction of VAR, since players would know that they would not be able to get away with anything under the new system.

A player is automatically suspended for the next match for the following offences:
 Receiving a red card (red card suspensions may be extended for serious offences)
 Receiving two yellow cards in two matches; yellow cards expire after the completion of the quarter-finals (yellow card suspensions are not carried forward to any other future international matches)

The following suspensions were served during the tournament:

Awards

The following awards were given at the conclusion of the tournament. The Golden Boot (top scorer), Golden Ball (best overall player) and Golden Glove (best goalkeeper) awards were all sponsored by Adidas.

Additionally, FIFA.com shortlisted 18 goals for users to vote on as the tournament's best. The poll closed on 23 July. The award was sponsored by Hyundai.

All-Star Team
FIFA published an All-Star Team, this year called the Fantasy Team, based on player performances evaluated through statistical data.

Dream Team
The users of FIFA.com elected their Fan Dream Team.

Prize money
Prize money amounts were announced in October 2017.

Marketing

Branding
The tournament logo was unveiled on 28 October 2014 by cosmonauts at the International Space Station and then projected onto Moscow's Bolshoi Theatre during an evening television programme. Russian Sports Minister Vitaly Mutko said the logo was inspired by "Russia's rich artistic tradition and its history of bold achievement and innovation", and FIFA president Sepp Blatter stated that it reflected the "heart and soul" of the country. For branding, Portuguese design agency Brandia Central created materials in 2014, with a typeface called Dusha –  – designed by Brandia Central and edited by Adotbelow of the DSType Foundry in Portugal.

Ticketing
The first phase of ticket sales started on 14 September 2017, 12:00 Moscow Time, and lasted until 12 October 2017.

The general visa policy of Russia did not apply to participants and spectators, who were able to visit Russia without a visa right before and during the competition regardless of their citizenship. Spectators were nonetheless required to register for a "Fan-ID", a special photo identification pass. A Fan-ID was required to enter the country visa-free, while a ticket, Fan-ID and a valid passport were required to enter stadiums for matches. Fan-IDs also granted World Cup attendees free access to public transport services, including buses, and train service between host cities. Fan-ID was administered by the Ministry of Digital Development, Communications and Mass Media, which could revoke this accreditation at any time to "ensure the defence capability or security of the state or public order".

Merchandise

On 29 May 2018, Electronic Arts released a free update to their video game FIFA 18 that added content related to the 2018 FIFA World Cup. The expansion included a World Cup tournament mode with all teams and stadiums from the event, official television presentation elements, and World Cup-related content for the Ultimate Team mode.

Panini continued their partnership with FIFA by producing stickers for their World Cup sticker album. Panini also developed an app for the 2018 World Cup where fans could collect and swap virtual stickers, with 5 million fans gathering digital stickers for the tournament.

Symbols

Mascot

The tournament's official mascot was unveiled on 21 October 2016, and selected through a design competition among university students. A public vote was used to select the mascot from three finalists—a cat, a tiger, and a wolf. The winner, with 53% or approximately 1 million votes, was Zabivaka—an anthropomorphic wolf dressed in the colours of the Russian national team. Zabivaka's name is a portmanteau of the Russian words забияка ("hothead") and забивать ("to score"), and his official backstory states that he is an aspiring football player who is "charming, confident and social".

Match ball

The official match ball, the "Telstar 18", was unveiled on 9 November 2017. It was based on the name and design of the first Adidas World Cup ball from 1970. A special red-coloured variation, "Telstar Mechta", was used for the knockout stage of the tournament. The word mechta (Russian: мечта) means "dream" or "ambition".

Goalkeepers noted that the ball was slippery and prone to having unpredictable trajectory. In addition, two Telstar 18 balls popped in the midst of a first-round match between France and Australia, leading to further discussions over the ball's performance.

Music

The official song of the tournament was "Live It Up", with vocals by Will Smith, Nicky Jam and Era Istrefi, released on 25 May 2018. Its music video was released on 8 June 2018.

Other controversies

Thirty-three footballers who were alleged to be part of the Russian steroid programme are listed in the McLaren Report. On 22 December 2017, it was reported that FIFA had fired a doctor who had been investigating doping in Russian football. On 22 May 2018 FIFA confirmed that the investigations concerning all Russian players named for the provisional squad of the FIFA World Cup in Russia had been completed, with the result that insufficient evidence was found to support anti-doping rule violations. FIFA's medical committee also decided that Russian personnel would not be involved in performing drug testing procedures at the tournament, an action taken to reassure teams that samples would not be tampered with.

Russia relaxed its visa rules during the World Cup, allowing Fan ID holders to enter and exit Russia without a visa through 31 December 2018. Traffickers exploited this system to bring foreign sex trafficking victims into the country, especially from Nigeria. Reuters had raised concerns about the victims' conditions, who had allegedly been forced into prostitution, with some of them enduring violent abuse. Russian authorities were accused of doing little to fix to the issue, allegedly because many locals blamed the victims for falling into prostitution.

Response to Skripal poisoning
In response to the March 2018 poisoning of Sergei and Yulia Skripal, British prime minister Theresa May announced that no British ministers or members of the royal family would attend the World Cup, and issued a warning to any travelling England fans. Russia responded to the comments from the UK Parliament claiming that the West are trying to "take the World Cup out of Russia". The Russian Foreign Ministry denounced Boris Johnson's statements that compared the event to the 1936 Olympics held in Nazi Germany as "poisoned with venom of hate, unprofessionalism and boorishness" and "unacceptable and unworthy" parallel towards Russia, a "nation that lost millions of lives in fighting Nazism".

Critical reception

At the close of the World Cup, Russia was widely praised for its success in hosting the tournament, with Steve Rosenberg of the BBC deeming it "a resounding public relations success" for Putin, adding: "The stunning new stadiums, free train travel to venues and the absence of crowd violence has impressed visiting supporters. Russia has come across as friendly and hospitable: a stark contrast with the country's authoritarian image. All the foreign fans I have spoken to are pleasantly surprised."

Despite the British Foreign Office and MPs repeatedly warning English football fans travelling to Russia of "racist or homophobic intimidation, hooligan violence and anti-British hostility", fans who did travel said they received a warm welcome from ordinary citizens after arriving in Russia.

FIFA president Gianni Infantino stated: "Everyone discovered a beautiful country, a welcoming country, that is keen to show the world that everything that has been said before might not be true. A lot of preconceived ideas have been changed because people have seen the true nature of Russia." Infantino has proclaimed Russia 2018 to be "the best World Cup ever", as 98 per cent of the stadiums were sold out, there were 3 billion viewers on TV around the world and 7 million fans visited the fan fests. It was the most viewed World Cup to date, and the third most viewed television broadcast, surpassing the Beijing Olympics in 2008.

However, some Western media outlets called the tournament a distraction from the international isolation and economic difficulties Russia has been facing.

Broadcasting rights

FIFA, through several companies, sold the broadcasting rights for the 2018 FIFA World Cup to various local broadcasters. After having tested the technology at limited matches of the 2013 FIFA Confederations Cup, and the 2014 FIFA World Cup (via private tests and public viewings in the host city of Rio de Janeiro), the 2018 World Cup was the first World Cup in which all matches were produced in 4K ultra high definition. Host Broadcast Services (HBS) stated that at least 75% of the broadcast cut of each match would come from 4K cameras (covering the majority of main angles), with instant replays and some camera angles being converted up from 1080p high definition sources with limited degradation in quality. These broadcasts were made available from selected rightsholders and television providers.

In February 2018, Ukrainian rightsholder UA:PBC stated that it would not broadcast the World Cup. This came in the wake of growing boycotts of the tournament among the Football Federation of Ukraine and sports minister Ihor Zhdanov. Additionally, the Football Federation of Ukraine refused to accredit journalists for the World Cup and waived their quota of tickets. However, the Ukrainian state TV still broadcast the World Cup, and more than 4 million Ukrainians watched the opening match.

Broadcast rights to the tournament in the Middle East were hampered by an ongoing diplomatic crisis in Qatar, which saw Bahrain, Egypt, Saudi Arabia, and the United Arab Emirates cut diplomatic ties with Qatar—the home country of FIFA's Middle East and Africa rightsholder beIN Sports—in June 2017, over its alleged state support of terrorist groups. On 2 June 2018, beIN pulled its channels from Du and Etisalat, but with service to the latter restored later that day. Etisalat subsequently announced that it would air the World Cup in the UAE, and continue to offer beIN normally and without interruptions. In Saudi Arabia, beIN was banned from doing business; as a result, its channels and other content have been widely and illegally repackaged by a broadcaster identifying itself as "beoutQ". While FIFA attempted to negotiate the sale of a package consisting of Saudi matches and the final indirectly, they were unable to do so. On 12 July 2018, FIFA stated that it had "engaged counsel to take legal action in Saudi Arabia and is working alongside other sports rights owners that have also been affected to protect its interests."

In the United States, the 2018 World Cup was the first men's World Cup whose English rights were held by Fox Sports, and Spanish rights held by Telemundo. The elimination of the United States in qualifying led to concerns that US interest and viewership of this World Cup would be reduced, noting that "casual" viewers of U.S. matches caused them to peak at 16.5 million viewers in 2014, and determined how much Fox paid for the rights. During a launch event prior to the elimination, Fox stated that it had planned to place a secondary focus on the Mexican team in its coverage to take advantage of their popularity among Hispanic and Latino Americans. Fox stated that it was still committed to broadcasting a significant amount of tournament coverage. Viewership was down overall over 2014; match scheduling was not as favourable to viewers in the Americas as it was in 2014. Many matches aired in the morning hours, although Telemundo's broadcast of the Mexico-Sweden Group F match was announced as being its most-watched weekday daytime program in network history.

Unlike previous tournaments, where the rights were bundled with those of South Korea, Korean Central Television acquired rights to the 2018 World Cup within North Korea. Broadcasts only began with the round of 16, and matches were tape delayed and edited for time. In addition, matches involving Japan were excluded from the broadcasts, due to strained relations and campaigns against the country.

Sponsorship

Audience
A combined 3.572 billion unique viewers (live global 1-minute reach) – more than half of the global population aged four and over – tuned in to world football's ultimate competition, according to audience data for official broadcast coverage of the 2018 FIFA World Cup.

The average global live audience for every game of the tournament was 191 million viewers (for a cumulative live audience of 12.224  billion viewers), a 2.1% increase over the 2014 tournament average of 187 million viewers, including that average audience in the early stages (group stage and round of 16) were bigger than in 2014. However, in 2018, the audience was 15 percent smaller for the semi-finals, 17 percent for the third place play-off, and 5.1 percent for the final, which was watched by 517 million people on average (only in-home TV viewers), compared to 545 million in 2014. Presumably, the reason for that is the smaller countries involved in the top four games compared to those in 2014, and only one global region (Europe) being represented in 2018 (compared to South America and Europe in 2014). However the live global 1-minute reach of the final was 1.12 billion people (884.37 in-home TV viewers and 231.82 million out-of-home and (or) digital-only viewers).

See also

 FIFA World Cup
 FIFA World Cup hosts
 2017 FIFA Confederations Cup
 2019 FIFA Women's World Cup

References

External links

 FIFA.com 2018 website
 Official Technical Report
 Results at RSSSF
 

 
2018 in association football
2017–18 in Russian football
2018
2018 Fifa World Cup
June 2018 sports events in Russia
July 2018 sports events in Russia
Association football controversies